The 2002–03 season was the 97th season in the existence of AJ Auxerre and the club's 23rd consecutive season in the top-flight of French football. In addition to the domestic league, Auxerre participated in this season's editions of the Coupe de France, the Coupe de la Ligue, the UEFA Champions League and UEFA Cup.

Season summary
Auxerre missed out on only a second-ever league title by four points, finishing in sixth to qualify for the UEFA Cup. They were also knocked out of the Champions League in the first group stage, finishing behind Arsenal and Dortmund, and the UEFA Cup in the fourth round by Liverpool. Compensation came in the form of winning the Coupe de France.

First team squad
Squad at end of season

Left club during season

Squad statistics

Competitions

Overall record

Ligue 1

League table

Results summary

Results by round

Matches

Coupe de France

Coupe de la Ligue

Champions League

Third qualifying round

First group stage

UEFA Cup

Third round

Fourth round

Transfers

In

Out

Loans in

Loans out

References

AJ Auxerre seasons
AJ Auxerre